Yanjaa Wintersoul, known simplyously as Yanjaa (born Mongolian: Yanjindulam) is a Mongolian–Swedish triple world-record holding memory athlete, public speaker, and polyglot. She is one of only 22 international grandmasters of memory. She first rose to prominence in memory sports in 2014 by winning the team gold medal as well as first place in names and faces at the World Memory Championships 2014 in Haikou, China during her first year of memory training, at the age of 20.

In December 2017, she broke two world records at the 2017 World Memory Championships in Jakarta, Indonesia by memorizing 212 names and faces in 15 minutes and 354 random images in 5 minutes. In August 2018, Yanjaa broke a third world record at the Korean Memory Championships 2018 by memorizing 145 random words in 5 minutes.

Yanjaa and Mongolian teammate Munkhshur Narmandakh became the first women in history to place at the world event, placing in bronze and silver position respectively out of over 130 contestants.

Early life and education 
Yanjaa was born in Ulaanbaatar, Mongolia to a Buryat-Mongolian mother and a Khalkha-Mongolian father. She grew up in Mongolia, Stockholm, Tokyo and attended boarding school in Kenya at the Swedish School of Nairobi where she studied Swahili and philosophy. Yanjaa graduated from Stockholm Business School with a degree in Business and Economics, where she was an active member of the student council marketing team. She also attended the University of Uppsala to study art history during this time.

Career 
Yanjaa was originally inspired to compete in memory after reading Moonwalking with Einstein by American author and former US memory champion Joshua Foer. She entered her first memory competition two months after reading it, receiving the newcomer award and placing first in the discipline names and faces at a German Open Memory competition in Munich, Germany. She has since medalled in a number of competitions as well as broken numerous memory records (see Records). In 2015 Yanjaa was invited as one of the top 200 Leaders of Tomorrow at the 46th St. Gallen Symposium in St. Gallen, Switzerland for her achievements in memory sports at a young age.

In 2015 Yanjaa starred in the Swedish documentary Masterminds, following the moments leading up to the Swedish Memory Championships 2014 where she placed second overall. Yanjaa was featured in the 2016 documentary How to Remember Everything, which covered the 2014 World Memory Championships in Haikou, China. Yanjaa was invited to speak at Investor AB's 100th anniversary, where she demonstrated recall of 10 of the 100 names and faces she had to memorize. She has also been interviewed and featured for memory training and language learning on Today, The Guardian, Wired as well as numerous national media publications in Sweden, China and Mongolia. 

Yanjaa was a contestant on the final season of the Chinese television program The Brain in 2017, defeating her opponent Yu Yipei by memorizing more synthesized images winning on accuracy over speed. She was a contestant on the 2017 comeback season of the talent show Talang, the Swedish version of Got Talent. In the audition round, Yanjaa received the golden buzzer from judge Alexander Bard and immediately advanced to the semi-finals by memorizing twenty names and faces in 90 seconds. After a successful semi-finals round in which she memorized 30 digits in 30 seconds, she advanced to the finals where she ended up in fifth place.

In September 2017 Yanjaa was featured as the "IKEA Human Catalogue 2018", having memorized the entire catalogue in just a week before the launch of the new catalogue. The campaign was a success landing press conferences in Thailand, Malaysia and Singapore and multiple appearances on the Steve Harvey show and other talk shows. In May 2018, the campaign was voted as people's voice and the official jury's Webby Award for best social media ad campaign. In 2017, she began production for a documentary called Memory Games with Emmy Award-winning director Janet Tobias. The documentary premiered in New York in November 2018. An additional screening was scheduled because the premiere sold out. Memory Games was bought by Netflix and launched on June 19, 2019. Yanjaa was featured in her second Netflix project on September 11, 2019. The Mind, Explained is a limited series narrated by Emma Stone in collaboration with Vox Media.

Notable competitions

2014 
 3rd Regional German Open Memory Championship (Apr. 4–5, Neubiberg, Germany) 18th place overall. First competition entered, Yanjaa medaled in shared first place in the discipline names and faces.
 Gothenburg Open Memory Championship (May. 10–11, Gothenburg, Sweden) Bronze medal overall.
 1st Spanish Open Memory Championship (Oct 18, Madrid, Spain): Bronze medal overall.
 World Memory Championships (Dec. 11–14, Haikou, China): Team gold medal, gold medalist in 15-minute names and faces as well as bronze in 15-minute abstract images.

2015 
 Extreme Memory Tournament (May. 2–3, San Diego, USA): Yanjaa made it to the round of 16.
 Hong Kong Open Memory Championship (Aug. 22–23, Hong Kong, China): Silver medal overall. Yanjaa broke the world record for memorizing the most names and faces in 15 minutes: 187 names.
 UK Open Memory Championship (Aug. 27–28, London, UK): Silver medal overall. Yanjaa broke the national record for memorizing the most words in 15 minutes: 256 words.
 World Memory Championships (Dec. 16–18, Chengdu, China): 8th place overall out of 275 contestants.

2016 
 Extreme Memory Tournament (June. 24–26, San Diego, USA): Yanjaa made it to the round of 16.

2017 
 World Memory Championships (Dec. 1–3, Jakarta, Indonesia): Bronze overall, double international grandmaster of memory and team gold. Yanjaa broke two world records, in Names & Faces and Random Images, the most world records broken at the event – second only to overall champion Alex Mullen. Gold in names and faces as well as images, silver in speed cards and words.

2018 

 Japan Open Memory Championship (Apr. 29–30, Tokyo, Japan): Gold medal overall.
Korea Open Memory Championship (Aug. 25–26, Seoul, South Korea): Broke two world records. Broke the world record in 5-minute random words by memorizing 145 random words. Beat own world record in random images by memorizing 360 random images in 5 minutes.

Records 
As of September 11, 2018, Yanjaa holds 3 world records, 6 national records and ranks 7th in the world as a memory athlete.

See also 
 World Memory Championships
 List of Swedish sportspeople
 Grand Master of Memory
 Memory sport
 Mnemonist
 Polyglot

References

External links 
 Official website

Living people
1993 births
Mongolian sportspeople
Swedish sportspeople
Mnemonists